Stephen Morgan (born 19 September 1968) is an English football coach and former professional footballer.

As a player, he was a defender from 1986 until 2000, notably for Coventry City in the Premier League, and in the Football League with Blackpool, Plymouth Argyle, Bristol Rovers, Wigan Athletic, Bury, Burnley, Hull City and Halifax Town. He finished his career with Non-league Altrincham.

Following his retirement he has worked in youth team coaching and has held roles at Oldham Athletic and Accrington Stanley.

Playing career
Morgan began his career with Blackpool, after progressing through the club's successful youth ranks. He made his first-team debut on 17 March 1986, as a substitute in a 1–1 draw with Bolton Wanderers at Bloomfield Road.

A strong, well-built player, he was comfortable in either a defensive or midfield role, and spent much of his early career deep in defence alongside Dave Burgess or Mike Davies. Fast and skilful, he possessed an accurate cross, often after an overlapping run down the left flank.

Morgan was virtually an ever-present throughout his first three seasons, although his popularity faltered when fans questioned his attitude to the cause. Indeed, his playing style often gave the impression that he was too relaxed, and with the Blackpool struggling in the Third Division, he was often made a scapegoat by supporters.

Towards the end of the 1988–89 season, First Division Wimbledon reportedly offered around £300,000 for him. The cash-strapped Seasiders could have used the money, but Morgan could not agree personal terms with the Londoners. A year later, in July 1990, he joined Second Division Plymouth Argyle for less than one-third of the amount Wimbledon had allegedly offered.

Morgan went on to play for six other clubs, including loan periods at Bristol Rovers and Bury, before bringing his fourteen-year professional career to a close in 2000 with Halifax Town, after playing just one game for the Shaymen.

He joined Altrincham soon after and retired from competitive football at the end of the 2000–01 season.

Coaching career
Morgan took up a coaching role with Oldham Athletic in 2008, coaching their U15 side.

References

English footballers
1968 births
Living people
Blackpool F.C. players
Plymouth Argyle F.C. players
Coventry City F.C. players
Bristol Rovers F.C. players
Wigan Athletic F.C. players
Bury F.C. players
Burnley F.C. players
Hull City A.F.C. players
Halifax Town A.F.C. players
Altrincham F.C. players
Footballers from Oldham
Premier League players
Oldham Athletic A.F.C. non-playing staff
Accrington Stanley F.C. non-playing staff
Association football defenders